The Human Factor may refer to:

Film and television

Film 
 The "Human" Factor (1975 film), a thriller directed by Edward Dmytryk
 The Human Factor (1979 film), a film based on Graham Greene's novel (see below), directed by Otto Preminger
 The Human Factor (2013 film), an Italian film directed by Bruno Oliviero
 The Human Factor (2019 film), a documentary on peace negotiations in the Middle East, directed by Dror Moreh
 Invictus (film), working title The Human Factor, a 2009 American film directed by Clint Eastwood

Television 
 The Human Factor (TV series), a 1992 American medical drama
 Human Factor (TV series), an Armenian weekday news program
 The Human Factor (audio drama), based on the British TV series Doctor Who

Episodes
 "The Human Factor" (MacGyver)
 "The Human Factor" (1963 The Outer Limits)
 "The Human Factor" (2002 The Outer Limits)

Literature 
 The Human Factor (novel), a 1978 novel by Graham Greene
 The Human Factor: Revolutionizing the Way We Live with Technology, a 2004 nonfiction book by Kim Vicente
 The Human Factor: Inside the CIA's Dysfunctional Intelligence Culture, a 2008 nonfiction book by Ishmael Jones

Music 
 The Human Factor (album) or the title song, by Metal Church, 1991
 "The Human Factor" (song), by Music for Pleasure, 1980

Other uses 
 Human factors and ergonomics, the study of human performance in work environments